The 2019 Nigerian Senate election in Imo State was held on February 23, 2019, to elect members of the Nigerian Senate to represent Imo State. Rochas Okorocha representing Imo West and Frank Ibezim representing Imo North won on the platform of All Progressives Congress, while Onyewuchi Francis Ezenwa representing Imo East won on the platform of Peoples Democratic Party.

Overview

Summary

Results

Imo South 
A total of 37 candidates registered with the Independent National Electoral Commission to contest in the election. APC candidate Rochas Okorocha won the election, defeating APC candidate Victor Onyerari and 35 other party candidates. Okorocha scored 92,622 votes, while PDP candidate, Onyerari scored 63,117 votes.

Imo East 
A total of 37 candidates registered with the Independent National Electoral Commission to contest in the election. PDP candidate Onyewuchi Francis Ezenwa won the election, defeating APC candidate Emmanuel Umunakwe and 35 other party candidates. Ezenwa pulled 146,647 votes, while APC candidate Umunakwe scored 33,729.

Imo North 
APC candidate Benjamin Uwajumogu won the election, defeating PDP candidate Hon. Patrick Ndubueze.

2020 Bye election 
A bye election was held on 5 December 2020 in the Imo North Senatorial District due to a vacancy following the demise of Benjamin Uwajumogu. Frank Ibezim of APC contested against Emmanuel Okewulonu of PDP and 12 other part candidates. They totalled 36,811 and 31,903 votes respectively. Ibezim was declared the winner by INEC.

References 

Imo State senatorial elections
Imo State Senate elections